

Events

Pre-1600
AD 65 – The freedman Milichus betrays Piso's plot to kill the Emperor Nero and all the conspirators are arrested.
 531 – Battle of Callinicum: A Byzantine army under Belisarius is defeated by the Persians at Raqqa (northern Syria).
 797 – Empress Irene organizes a conspiracy against her son, the Byzantine emperor Constantine VI. He is deposed and blinded. Shortly after, Constantine dies of his wounds; Irene proclaims herself basileus.
1506 – The Lisbon Massacre begins, in which accused Jews are slaughtered by Portuguese Catholics.
1529 – Beginning of the Protestant Reformation: After the Second Diet of Speyer bans Lutheranism, a group of rulers (German: Fürst) and independent cities protests the reinstatement of the Edict of Worms.
1539 – The Treaty of Frankfurt between Protestants and the Holy Roman Emperor is signed.

1601–1900
1608 – In Ireland: O'Doherty's Rebellion is launched by the Burning of Derry.
1617 – The town of Uusikaupunki (lit. "New Town") is founded by King Gustavus Adolphus of Sweden.
1677 – The French army captures the town of Cambrai held by Spanish troops.
1713 – With no living male heirs, Charles VI, Holy Roman Emperor, issues the Pragmatic Sanction of 1713 to ensure that Habsburg lands and the Austrian throne would be inheritable by a female; his daughter and successor, Maria Theresa was not born until 1717.
1770 – Captain James Cook, still holding the rank of lieutenant, sights the eastern coast of what is now Australia.
  1770   – Marie Antoinette marries Louis XVI of France in a proxy wedding.
1775 – American Revolutionary War: The war begins with an American victory in Concord during the battles of Lexington and Concord.
1782 – John Adams secures Dutch recognition of the United States as an independent government. The house which he had purchased in The Hague becomes the first American embassy.
1809 – An Austrian corps is defeated by the forces of the Duchy of Warsaw in the Battle of Raszyn, part of the struggles of the Fifth Coalition. On the same day the Austrian main army is defeated by a First French Empire Corps led by Louis-Nicolas Davout at the Battle of Teugen-Hausen in Bavaria, part of a four-day campaign that ended in a French victory.
1810 – Venezuela achieves home rule: Vicente Emparán, Governor of the Captaincy General is removed by the people of Caracas and a junta is installed.
1818 – French physicist Augustin Fresnel signs his preliminary "Note on the Theory of Diffraction" (deposited on the following day). The document ends with what we now call the Fresnel integrals.
1839 – The Treaty of London establishes Belgium as a kingdom and guarantees its neutrality.
1861 – American Civil War: Baltimore riot of 1861: A pro-Secession mob in Baltimore attacks United States Army troops marching through the city.

1901–present
1903 – The Kishinev pogrom in Kishinev (Bessarabia) begins, forcing tens of thousands of Jews to later seek refuge in Palestine and the Western world.
1927 – Mae West is sentenced to ten days in jail for obscenity for her play Sex.
1942 – World War II: In German-occupied Poland, the Majdan-Tatarski ghetto is established, situated between the Lublin Ghetto and a Majdanek subcamp.
1943 – World War II: In German-occupied Poland, the Warsaw Ghetto Uprising begins, after German troops enter the Warsaw Ghetto to round up the remaining Jews.
  1943   – Albert Hofmann deliberately doses himself with LSD for the first time, three days after having discovered its effects on April 16.
1956 – Actress Grace Kelly marries Prince Rainier of Monaco.
1960 – Students in South Korea hold a nationwide pro-democracy protest against president Syngman Rhee, eventually forcing him to resign.
1971 – Sierra Leone becomes a republic, and Siaka Stevens the president.
  1971   – Launch of Salyut 1, the first space station.
  1971   – Charles Manson is sentenced to death (later commuted to life imprisonment) for conspiracy in the Tate–LaBianca murders.
1973 – The Portuguese Socialist Party is founded in the German town of Bad Münstereifel.
1975 – India's first satellite Aryabhata launched in orbit from Kapustin Yar, Russia.
  1975   – South Vietnamese forces withdrew from the town of Xuan Loc in the last major battle of the Vietnam War.
1984 – Advance Australia Fair is proclaimed as Australia's national anthem, and green and gold as the national colours.
1985 – Two hundred ATF and FBI agents lay siege to the compound of the white supremacist survivalist group The Covenant, the Sword, and the Arm of the Lord in Arkansas; the CSA surrenders two days later. 
1987 – The Simpsons first appear as a series of shorts on The Tracey Ullman Show, first starting with "Good Night".
1993 – The 51-day FBI siege of the Branch Davidian building in Waco, Texas, USA, ends when a fire breaks out. Seventy-six Davidians, including eighteen children under the age of ten, died in the fire.
1995 – Oklahoma City bombing: The Alfred P. Murrah Federal Building in Oklahoma City, USA, is bombed, killing 168 people including 19 children under the age of six.
1999 – The German Bundestag returns to Berlin.
2000 – Air Philippines Flight 541 crashes in Samal, Davao del Norte, killing all 131 people on board.
2005 – Cardinal Joseph Ratzinger is elected to the papacy and becomes Pope Benedict XVI.
2011 – Fidel Castro resigns as First Secretary of the Communist Party of Cuba after holding the title since July 1961.
2013 – Boston Marathon bombing suspect Tamerlan Tsarnaev is killed in a shootout with police. His brother Dzhokhar is later captured hiding in a boat inside a backyard in the suburb of Watertown.
2020 – A killing spree in Nova Scotia, Canada, leaves 22 people and the perpetrator dead, making it the deadliest rampage in the country's history.
2021 – The Ingenuity helicopter becomes the first aircraft to achieve flight on another planet.

Births

Pre-1600
1452 – Frederick IV, King  of Naples (d. 1504)
1593 – Sir John Hobart, 2nd Baronet, English politician (d. 1647)

1601–1900
1603 – Michel Le Tellier, French politician, French Minister of Defence (d. 1685)
1613 – Christoph Bach, German musician (d. 1661)
1633 – Willem Drost, Dutch painter (d. 1659)
1655 – George St Lo(e), Royal Navy officer and administrator (d. 1718)
1658 – Johann Wilhelm, Elector Palatine, German husband of Archduchess Maria Anna Josepha of Austria (d. 1716)
1665 – Jacques Lelong, French author (d. 1721)
1686 – Vasily Tatishchev, Russian ethnographer and politician (d. 1750)
1715 – James Nares, English organist and composer (d. 1783)
1721 – Roger Sherman, American lawyer and politician (d. 1793)
1734 – Karl von Ordóñez, Austrian violinist and composer (d. 1786)
1757 – Edward Pellew, 1st Viscount Exmouth, English admiral and politician (d. 1833)
1758 – William Carnegie, 7th Earl of Northesk, Scottish admiral (d. 1831)
1785 – Alexandre Pierre François Boëly, French pianist and composer (d. 1858)
1787 – Deaf Smith, American soldier (d. 1837)
1793 – Ferdinand I of Austria (d. 1875)
1806 – Sarah Bagley, American labor organizer (d. 1889)
1814 – Louis Amédée Achard, French journalist and author (d. 1875)
1831 – Mary Louise Booth, American writer, editor and translator (d. 1889)
1832 – José Echegaray, Spanish poet and playwright, Nobel Prize laureate (d. 1916)
1835 – Julius Krohn, Finnish poet and journalist (d. 1888)
1863 – Hemmo Kallio, Finnish actor (d. 1940)
1872 – Alice Salomon, German social reformer (d. 1948)
1873 – Sydney Barnes, English cricketer (d. 1967)
1874 – Ernst Rüdin, Swiss psychiatrist, geneticist, and eugenicist (d. 1952)
1877 – Ole Evinrude, Norwegian-American engineer, invented the outboard motor (d. 1934)
1879 – Arthur Robertson, Scottish runner (d. 1957)
1882 – Getúlio Vargas, Brazilian lawyer and politician, 14th President of Brazil (d. 1954)
1883 – Henry Jameson, American soccer player (d. 1938)
  1883   – Richard von Mises, Austrian-American mathematician and physicist (d. 1953)
1885 – Karl Tarvas, Estonian architect (d. 1975)
1889 – Otto Georg Thierack, German jurist and politician (d. 1946)
1891 – Françoise Rosay, French actress (d. 1974)
1892 – Germaine Tailleferre, French composer and educator (d. 1983)
1894 – Elizabeth Dilling, American author and activist (d. 1966)
1897 – Peter de Noronha, Indian businessman and philanthropist (d. 1970)
  1897   – Jiroemon Kimura, Japanese super-centenarian, oldest verified man ever (d. 2013)
1898 – Constance Talmadge, American actress and producer (d. 1973)
1899 – George O'Brien, American actor (d. 1985)
  1899   – Cemal Tollu, Turkish lieutenant and painter (d. 1968)
1900 – Iracema de Alencar, Brazilian film actress (d. 1978)
  1900   – Richard Hughes, English author, poet, and playwright (d. 1976)
  1900   – Roland Michener, Canadian lawyer and politician, 20th Governor General of Canada (d. 1991)
  1900   – Rhea Silberta, American Yiddish songwriter and singing teacher (d. 1959)

1901–present
1902 – Veniamin Kaverin, Russian author and screenwriter (d. 1989)
1903 – Eliot Ness, American law enforcement agent (d. 1957)
1908 – Irena Eichlerówna, Polish actress  (d. 1990) 
1912 – Glenn T. Seaborg, American chemist and academic, Nobel Prize laureate (d. 1999)
1913 – Ken Carpenter, American discus thrower and coach (d. 1984)
1917 – Sven Hassel, Danish-German soldier and author (d. 2012)
1919 – Sol Kaplan, American pianist and composer (d. 1990)
1920 – Marvin Mandel, American lawyer and politician, 56th Governor of Maryland (d. 2015)
  1920   – Julien Ries, Belgian cardinal (d. 2013)
1921 – Anna Lee Aldred, American jockey (d. 2006)
  1921   – Leon Henkin, American logician (d. 2006)
  1921   – Roberto Tucci, Italian Jesuit leader, cardinal, and theologian (d. 2015)
1922 – Erich Hartmann, German colonel and pilot (d. 1993)
1922 – David Smith, politician in Rhodesia and Zimbabwe (d. 1996)
1925 – John Kraaijkamp, Sr., Dutch actor (d. 2011)
  1925   – Hugh O'Brian, American actor (d. 2016)
1926 – Rawya Ateya, Egyptian captain and politician (d. 1997)
1928 – John Horlock, English engineer and academic (d. 2015)
  1928   – Azlan Shah of Perak, Yang di-Pertuan Agong of Malaysia (d. 2014) 
1931 – Walter Stewart, Canadian journalist and author (d. 2004)
1932 – Fernando Botero, Colombian painter and sculptor
1933 – Jayne Mansfield, American model and actress (d. 1967)
1934 – Dickie Goodman, American singer-songwriter and producer (d. 1989)
1935 – Dudley Moore, English actor, comedian, and pianist (d. 2002)
  1935   – Justin Francis Rigali, American cardinal
1936 – Wilfried Martens, Belgian politician, 60th Prime Minister of Belgium (d. 2013)
  1936   – Jack Pardee, American football player and coach (d. 2013)
1937 – Antonio Carluccio, Italian-English chef and author (d. 2017)
  1937   – Elinor Donahue, American actress 
  1937   – Joseph Estrada, Filipino politician, 13th President of the Philippines
1938 – Stanley Fish, American theorist, author, and scholar
1939 – E. Clay Shaw, Jr., American accountant, judge, and politician (d. 2013)
1941 – Michel Roux, French-English chef and author (d. 2020)
  1941   – Bobby Russell, American singer-songwriter (d. 1992)
1942 – Alan Price, English keyboard player, singer, and composer
1943 – Margo MacDonald, Scottish journalist and politician (d. 2014)
1944 – James Heckman, American economist and academic, Nobel Prize laureate
  1944   – Bernie Worrell, American keyboard player and songwriter (d. 2016)
1946 – Tim Curry, English actor and singer
1951 – Jóannes Eidesgaard, Faroese educator and politician, Prime Minister of the Faroe Islands
1952 – Simon Cowell, English conservationist and author
1954 – Trevor Francis, English footballer and manager
1956 – Anne Glover, Scottish biologist and academic
1957 – Mukesh Ambani, Indian businessman, chairman of Reliance Industries
1960 – Ara Gevorgyan, Armenian pianist, composer, and producer
  1960   – Frank Viola, American baseball player and coach
1964 – Kim Weaver, American astrophysicist, astronomer, and academic
1966 – Véronique Gens, French soprano and actress
1968 – Mswati III, king (Ngwenyama) of Eswatini (Swaziland)
1970 – Kelly Holmes, English athlete and double Olympic champion
1972 – Rivaldo Vitor Borba Ferreira, a Brazilian footballer
1978 – James Franco, American actor, director, producer, and screenwriter
  1978   – Amanda Sage, American-Austrian painter and educator
1981 – Hayden Christensen, Canadian actor
1982 – Samuel C. Morrison, Jr., Liberian-American journalist, producer, and screenwriter
1987 – Maria Sharapova, Russian tennis player
1990 – Kim Chiu, Filipino actress, singer, and dancer
2002 – Loren Gray, American singer and internet personality

Deaths

Pre-1600
 843 – Judith of Bavaria, Frankish empress
1012 – Ælfheah of Canterbury, English archbishop and saint (b. 954)
1013 – Hisham II, Umayyad caliph of Córdoba (b. 966)
1044 – Gothelo I, duke of Lorraine
1054 – Leo IX, pope of the Catholic Church (b. 1002)
1321 – Gerasimus I, patriarch of Constantinople
1390 – Robert II, king of Scotland (b. 1316)
1405 – Thomas West, 1st Baron West, English nobleman (b. 1335)
1431 – Adolph III, count of Waldeck (b. 1362)
1560 – Philip Melanchthon, German theologian and reformer (b. 1497)
1567 – Michael Stifel, German monk and mathematician (b. 1487)
1578 – Uesugi Kenshin, Japanese samurai and warlord (b. 1530)
1588 – Paolo Veronese, Italian painter (b. 1528)

1601–1900
1608 – Thomas Sackville, 1st Earl of Dorset, English poet, playwright, and politician, Lord High Treasurer (b. 1536)
1618 – Thomas Bastard, English priest and author (b. 1566)
1619 – Jagat Gosain, Mughal empress (b. 1573)
1629 – Sigismondo d'India, Italian composer (b. 1582)
1686 – Antonio de Solís y Ribadeneyra, Spanish historian and playwright (b. 1610)
1689 – Christina, queen of Sweden (b. 1626)
1733 – Elizabeth Hamilton, countess of Orkney (b. 1657)
1739 – Nicholas Saunderson, English mathematician and academic (b. 1682)
1768 – Canaletto, Italian painter and etcher (b. 1697)
1776 – Jacob Emden, German rabbi and author (b. 1697)
1791 – Richard Price, Welsh-English preacher and philosopher (b. 1723)
1813 – Benjamin Rush, American physician and educator (b. 1745)
1824 – Lord Byron, English-Scottish poet and playwright (b. 1788)
1831 – Johann Gottlieb Friedrich von Bohnenberger, German astronomer and mathematician (b. 1765)
1833 – James Gambier, 1st Baron Gambier, Bahamian-English admiral and politician, 36th Commodore Governor of Newfoundland (b. 1756)
1840 – Jean-Jacques Lartigue, Canadian bishop (b. 1777)
1854 – Robert Jameson, Scottish mineralogist and academic (b. 1774)
1881 – Benjamin Disraeli, English journalist and politician, Prime Minister of the United Kingdom (b. 1804)
1882 – Charles Darwin, English biologist and theorist (b. 1809)
1893 – Martin Körber, Estonian-German pastor, composer, and conductor (b. 1817)

1901–present
1901 – Alfred Horatio Belo, American publisher, founded The Dallas Morning News (b. 1839)
1903 – Oliver Mowat, Canadian politician, third Premier of Ontario, eighth Lieutenant Governor of Ontario (b. 1820)
1906 – Pierre Curie, French physicist and academic, Nobel Prize laureate (b. 1859)
  1906   – Spencer Gore, English tennis player and cricketer (b. 1850)
1909 – Signe Rink, Greenland-born Danish writer and ethnologist (b. 1836)
1914 – Charles Sanders Peirce, American mathematician and philosopher (b. 1839)
1915 – Thomas Playford II, English-Australian politician, 17th Premier of South Australia (b. 1837)
1916 – Ephraim Shay, American engineer, designed the Shay locomotive (b. 1839)
1926 – Alexander Alexandrovich Chuprov, Russian-Swiss statistician and theorist (b. 1874)
1930 – Georges-Casimir Dessaulles, Canadian businessman and politician (b. 1827)
1937 – Martin Conway, 1st Baron Conway of Allington, English cartographer and politician (b. 1856)
  1937   – William Morton Wheeler, American entomologist and zoologist (b. 1865)
1940 – Jack McNeela, Irish hunger striker
1941 – Johanna Müller-Hermann, Austrian composer (b. 1878)
1949 – Ulrich Salchow, Danish-Swedish figure skater (b. 1877)
1950 – Ernst Robert Curtius, French-German philologist and scholar (b. 1886)
1952 – Steve Conway, British singer (b. 1921)
1955 – Jim Corbett, British-Indian colonel, hunter, and author (b. 1875)
1960 – Beardsley Ruml, American economist and statistician (b. 1894)
1961 – Max Hainle, German swimmer (b. 1882)
1966 – Väinö Tanner, Finnish politician of Social Democratic Party of Finland; the Prime Minister of Finland (b. 1881)
1967 – Konrad Adenauer, German politician, 1st Chancellor of Germany (b. 1876)
1971 – Luigi Piotti, Italian race car driver (b. 1913)
1975 – Percy Lavon Julian, American chemist and academic (b. 1899)
1988 – Kwon Ki-ok, Korean pilot (b. 1901)
1989 – Daphne du Maurier, English novelist and playwright (b. 1907)
1991 – Stanley Hawes, English-Australian director and producer (b. 1905)
1992 – Frankie Howerd, English actor and screenwriter (b. 1917)
1993 – David Koresh, American religious leader (b. 1959)
  1993   – George S. Mickelson, American captain, lawyer, and politician, 28th Governor of South Dakota (b. 1941)
1998 – Octavio Paz, Mexican poet, philosopher, and academic Nobel Prize laureate (b. 1914)
1999 – Hermine Braunsteiner, Austrian-German SS officer (b. 1919)
2000 – Louis Applebaum, Canadian composer and conductor (b. 1918)
2002 – Reginald Rose, American writer (b. 1920)
2004 – Norris McWhirter, English author and activist co-founded the Guinness World Records (b. 1925)
  2004   – John Maynard Smith, English biologist and geneticist (b. 1920)
  2004   – Jenny Pike, Canadian WWII servicewoman and photographer (b. 1922)
2006 – Albert Scott Crossfield, American engineer, pilot, and astronaut (b. 1921)
2007 – Jean-Pierre Cassel, French actor (b. 1932)
2009 – J. G. Ballard, English novelist, short story writer, and essayist (b. 1930)
2011 – Elisabeth Sladen, English actress (b. 1946)
2012 – Levon Helm, American musician and actor (b. 1940)
2013 – François Jacob, French biologist and academic, Nobel Prize laureate (b. 1920)
  2013   – Al Neuharth, American journalist, author, and publisher, founded USA Today (b. 1924)
2015 – Raymond Carr, English historian and academic (b. 1919)
  2015   – Roy Mason, English miner and politician, Secretary of State for Defence (b. 1924)
2016 – Patricio Aylwin, Chilean politician (b. 1918)
2021 – Walter Mondale, American politician, 42nd Vice President of the United States (b. 1928)
  2021   – Jim Steinman, American composer, lyricist (b. 1947)

 2022 – Kane Tanaka, Japanese supercentenarian (b. 1903)

Holidays and observances
 Christian feast day:
 Ælfheah of Canterbury (Anglican, Catholic)
 Conrad of Ascoli 
 Emma of Lesum
 Expeditus
 George of Antioch
 Olaus and Laurentius Petri (Lutheran)
 Pope Leo IX
 Ursmar
 April 19 (Eastern Orthodox liturgics)

References

External links

 BBC: On This Day
 
 Historical Events on April 19

Days of the year
April